Hangaroa may refer to:
Hangaroa River in Gisborne District, New Zealand
The Hangaroa statistical area which includes Tiniroto
Hanga Roa in Easter Island